Argos Orestiko (before 1926: Χρούπιστα - Chroupista) is a town and a former municipality in the Kastoria regional unit, Greece. Since the 2011 local government reform it is part of the municipality Orestida, of which it is the seat and a municipal unit. The municipal unit has an area of 206.396 km2. The Kastoria National Airport (also known as Aristotelis Airport) is located in Argos Orestiko.

History

Antiquity
In antiquity, Argos Orestikon was the main town of the Orestae. It was said to have been founded by Orestes, the son of Agamemnon, who fled from Argos in the Peloponnese after the murder of his mother.

The exact location of classical Argos Orestikon has not been found. Based on epigraphic evidence, the administrative centre of the Orestae lay near the centre of the present town Argos Orestiko, at a site named "Armenochori". During the campaign of Alexander the Great to the East, settlers from the town founded another Argos Orestikon to distant Scythian steppes during the 4th century BCE.

Modern period
At least since the 16th century, Argos Orestiko has a notable annual trade fair.

Towards the end of the 18th century, Aromanians from Moscopole settled in the town; later more followed from the villages of Gramosta and Samarina. According to a statistical report by British Colonel Henry Synge, dated 12 June 1878, the kaza of Chroupista (Argos Orestiko) had 4,565 Greek and 4,220 Aromanian males who were Orthodox Christians and recognized the Ecumenical Patriarchate of Constantinople (opposing the Bulgarian Exarchate); it also had 2,290 Muslim males. At the turn of the 20th century, the town of Argos Orestiko was inhabited by Greeks, Aromanians, Bulgarians, and Turks. In the late Ottoman period, the town was wealthy, had four mosques and many of its Muslim population were involved in agriculture and trade. During the end of the 19th century, it had a number of Greek schools, but also a Bulgarian and Romanian one; at that time, the Greek language prevailed in the town, even among Aromanians and Bulgarians, and particularly the former had a Greek national consciousness.

The Greek census (1920) recorded 3,603 people in the town and in 1923 there were 1500 inhabitants (or 200 families) who were Muslim. Following the Greek-Turkish population exchange, in 1926 within the town there were refugee families from East Thrace (10), Asia Minor (69), Pontus (132) and the Caucasus (1). The Greek census (1928) recorded 3,605 town inhabitants. There were 214 refugee families (852 people) in 1928. After the population exchange, the main mosque of the town was replaced with a church built and dedicated to Saint Paraskevi; the other three mosques were destroyed.

Notable people
 Toma Caragiu (1925–1977)
 Demetri Dollis (born 1956)
 Patrona Halil (1690–1730)
 Tom and John Kiradjieff (1892–1960, 1895–1953)
 Filip Mișea (1873–1944)

See also
 Archaeological Museum of Argos Orestiko
 Fossil Exhibition (Nostimo), a village 14 km away from Argos Orestiko

References

Former municipalities in Western Macedonia
Populated places in Kastoria (regional unit)
Aromanian settlements in Greece